Brett Timothy Hauer (born July 11, 1971) is an American former professional ice hockey defenseman who played parts of three seasons in the National Hockey League (NHL) for the Edmonton Oilers and Nashville Predators.

Playing career
Hauer spent his amateur career with the University of Minnesota Duluth after a successful high school career, which saw him drafted in the fourth round of the 1989 NHL Entry Draft, 71st overall, by the Vancouver Canucks.

Hauer played for the Edmonton Oilers and Nashville Predators at the NHL level, playing a total of 37 regular season games, scoring 4 goals and 4 assists for 8 points, collecting 38 penalty minutes.  In the minors, he played for six teams in the American and International Hockey Leagues, most notably with the Manitoba Moose from 1997 to 2001.  He remains the highest scoring defenseman in that franchise's history.

Later in his career, Hauer played in Europe, playing in Switzerland for Genève-Servette HC, EV Zug and HC Davos. In 2006, he played in the Russian Super League for Lokomotiv Yaroslavl. The next season though, he returned to Switzerland, playing for EHC Basel, before retiring in 2008.

International play

During his career, Hauer represented Team USA at the IIHF World Championships four times (1995, 2003, 2004 and 2005) and once at the Winter Olympics (1994).

Career statistics

Regular season and playoffs

International

Awards and honors

Transactions 
August 24, 1995 - The Vancouver Canucks trades Hauer to the Edmonton Oilers in exchange for a 7th round choice in the 1997 NHL Entry Draft
July 8, 2001 - The Los Angeles Kings signs Hauer as a free agent
December 19, 2001 - The Los Angeles Kings trades Hauer to the Nashville Predators in exchange for Rich Brennan

References

External links 

1971 births
Living people
AIK IF players
American men's ice hockey defensemen
Cape Breton Oilers players
Chicago Wolves (IHL) players
Edmonton Oilers players
EHC Basel players
EV Zug players
American expatriate ice hockey players in Russia
Genève-Servette HC players
HC Davos players
Ice hockey players at the 1994 Winter Olympics
Las Vegas Thunder players
Lokomotiv Yaroslavl players
Manchester Monarchs (AHL) players
Manitoba Moose (IHL) players
Milwaukee Admirals players
Minnesota Duluth Bulldogs men's ice hockey players
Nashville Predators players
Olympic ice hockey players of the United States
People from Richfield, Minnesota
Vancouver Canucks draft picks
Ice hockey players from Minnesota
AHCA Division I men's ice hockey All-Americans